Emil Ludwig Siepmann (August 25, 1863 – November 2, 1950) was a German industrialist and politician.

Life and career

Early life 
Siepmann was born in Hagen, Kingdom of Prussia. His parents Heinrich-Wilhelm Siepmann and Luise (née Siepmann) operated a wood wholesale company. He grew-up with a bourgeois background and was confronted with drop forging technologies from an early age as there was a small drop forge operation nearby his parents' house. He was a technophilic personality. After completing his schooling he completed a commercial apprenticeship as the only formal education he'd ever receive.

Industrial activities 
It was in 1892 when he was offered a position by his brother-in-law Louis Peters who had taken over the former manufacturing plant of Hüsing & Company in Warstein. They were known for producing spades, shovels, hay and manure forks forged from steel and iron. From this period the company was named Peters & Co, however the two initiators and entrepreneurs behind it were Emil and Hugo Siepmann. He was the commercial and technical director while his brother, also a partner, was mainly active in the distribution of the products. Around 1895 they employed already about 90 people and became very influential local industrialists.

Over time, the company was completely converted to drop forging. In 1916 a new hammer was built with an 85 ton anvil. That was the heaviest hammer that existed in a production plant in Germany at the time. All bridges from Soest to Warstein had to be reinforced for its transport to Siepmann's works. The company had been an important supplier to the bicycle and later to the automobile and railroad industries since the turn of the century. Siepmann was also active as a patron in his workforce and the place. In 1921, the Siepmann brothers donated 250,000 marks (equal to about 1m$ today's currency) for the construction of a children's home on the island of Norderney. He also put his skills at the service of the public when he was elected to the district council of Arnsberg in November 1904 in the regular supplementary election from the electoral association of larger landowners. He campaigned for new railway connections and a power station. He was a member of the relevant commissions. From 1909 to 1929 he was also a board member of the Warstein Savings Bank.

Family 
In 1896, Emil Siepmann married Marie Magdalene Conradine (née Schuette; 1875-1941). The couple had five children of which four reached adulthood. 

 Hans Siepmann (November 4, 1897 - July 31, 1919); deemed successor of Emil but died early aged 22.
 Lotte Siepmann (April 8, 1900 - January 7, 1970); married Dr. med. Carl Mueller of Soest 
 Gerhard Siepmann (1904-1904); died in childbed
 Ernst Ludwig Siepmann (November 20, 1906 - April 21, 1968); director at Siepmann 
 Kaethe Siepmann (February 12, 1910 - June 13, 1986); married Carl Voswinkel who worked for Siepmann

Siepmann resided closely to his brothers family as well. They shared two residences on split acreage. While Hugo and family occupied the house at Hauptstrasse 145, he owned the house at Hauptstrasse 143 in Warstein. He died only four weeks after his younger brother.

References 

 Warstein's path of the coal industry
 1075 years of Belecke (Mohne), Germany
 Siepmann Industries 1891-1951
 Rudolf Vierhaus; Deutsche Biographische Enzyklopädie (DBE); Siepmann
 Karl-Peter Ellerbrock und Tanja Bessler-Worbs; Hugo Siepmann; in Wirtschaft und Gesellschaft im südöstlichen Westfalen

External links 
 Siepmann Industries website
 PERSTA Steel-Fixtures website

1863 births
1950 deaths
German industrialists
20th-century German politicians